The Adventures of Tom Thumb and Thumbelina is a 2002 American animated fantasy film directed by Glenn Chaika and starring Jennifer Love Hewitt, Elijah Wood, Peter Gallagher, and Jon Stewart. Produced by Miramax Films and Hyperion Animation, the film was distributed by Buena Vista Home Entertainment under the Miramax Home Entertainment label.

Plot

After escaping from the circus, to which she was kidnapped as a baby, tiny Thumbelina (Jennifer Love Hewitt) sets out to find others of her diminutive stature and the place where she belongs. She happens upon Tom Thumb (Elijah Wood), who was raised by a good normal-sized man. He is not only similar to her in size, but is also looking for others like him. But just as they fall in love, Thumbelina is taken prisoner by the terribly sinister Mole King (Peter Gallagher), who wants to make her his bride. Thumbelina is the daughter of King and Queen of Gemworld, granddaughter of the previous King and Queen and Great Granddaughter of the first King and Queen.

Voice Cast

Production
The film is copyrighted 1999 but was not released until 2002. It was distributed internationally to Italy, where it debuted on 75 screens in 2004, earning €23,531 in its initial week of release.

Reception
Kevin Lee of DVD Verdict found the film "guilty", writing "Walt Disney is being held in contempt of this court for The Adventures of Tom Thumb and Thumbelina. This is simply not up to the usual standards of the Mouse House." Brian Costello of Common Sense Media gave the film four stars out of five, saying the film is "a fun tale with enough constant action and snappy dialogue to keep both children and adults entertained."

Awards
The Adventures of Tom Thumb and Thumbelina won a 2003 Golden Reel Award for Best Sound Editing in the Direct to Video category. In addition, the film was nominated for a 2003 DVD Premiere Award (administered by the DVD Exclusive Awards) in the categories of Best Animated Character Performance (Elijah Wood) and Best Animated DVD Premiere Movie.

References

External links

2002 films
2002 animated films
2002 direct-to-video films
Miramax animated films
Films about kidnapping
Films about royalty
Films based on Tom Thumb
Films based on Thumbelina
Buena Vista Home Entertainment direct-to-video films
2000s American animated films
American direct-to-video films
Hyperion Pictures films
Films with screenplays by Willard Carroll
Crossover animation
Animated crossover films
2000s English-language films